The Arabian lark (Eremalauda eremodites) is a small passerine bird of the lark family. It is a desert bird which is found from Syria to Jordan and through Saudi Arabia to Oman.

The Arabian lark was formerly considered conspecific with Dunn's lark, but was classified as a distinct species by the Handbook of the Birds of the World Alive and by Birdlife International, and later by the International Ornithological Congress.

References

Arabian lark
Arabian lark